Deutzen is a village and a former municipality in the Leipzig district, in Saxony, Germany. Since 1 July 2014, it is part of the municipality Neukieritzsch.

References 

Former municipalities in Saxony
Leipzig (district)